The Second Floor Mystery is a 1930 American pre-Code film directed by Roy Del Ruth. It was based on the 1916 novel The Agony Column by Earl Derr Biggers. The film stars Grant Withers, Loretta Young, H. B. Warner and John Loder.

Plot
Geoffrey West and Marion Ferguson (Grant Withers and Loretta Young), two American tourists in London, meet each other at a London hotel while eating breakfast. Both are reading the personal columns of The Times. The next day West inserts an ad, under the alias of Lord Strawberries, which requests her friendship. Ferguson, using the alias of Lady Grapefruit, places an ad in reply which suggests that he should write a series of five letters proving himself worth knowing.

West makes up a fabulous story about a murder mysterym based on the things he has heard his upstairs neighbors arguing about. Ferguson's aunt, who disapproves of West, suspects West is the murderer and contacts Scotland Yard. West's neighbor (the one he mentioned in his letters) is found dead and the police immediately suspect West and Ferguson as being involved in the murder. The real murderer, when he hears they are prime suspects, then attempts to frame them.

Cast
Grant Withers as Geoffrey West 
Loretta Young as Marion Ferguson
H.B. Warner as Inspector Bray 
Claire McDowell as Aunt Hattie 
Sidney Bracey as Alfred 
Crauford Kent as Capt. Fraser-Freer
John Loder as Fraser-Freer's Younger Brother  
Claude King as Enright   
Judith Vosselli as the Vamp

Preservation status
The film survives complete. A mute print was transferred onto 16mm film by Associated Artists Productions in the 1950s. The Vitaphone soundtrack was lost until 2004 and restored to the film by the UCLA Film and Television Archive. A 16mm copy is housed at the Wisconsin Center for Film and Theater Research. Also listed as being incomplete at the Library of Congress.

References

External links
 
 
 

1930 films
1930s comedy mystery films
1930s English-language films
Films based on American novels
Films based on mystery novels
Films directed by Roy Del Ruth
Warner Bros. films
American black-and-white films
Films set in London
American comedy mystery films
1930 comedy films
Films scored by Samuel Kaylin
1930s American films